Red Doors is a 2005 American independent film written and directed by Georgia Lee. Inspired by the director's own family, the film tells the coming of age story of a Chinese American family. Red Doors is Lee's first feature film. Early drafts won the Jerome Foundation New York Media Arts Grant Award, and later won the best narrative feature prize at the 2005 Tribeca Film Festival. Georgia Lee produced the movie alongside Jane Chen and Mia Riverton and co-producor John Fiorelli.

Plot
Red Doors tells the story of the Wongs, a Chinese-American family in the New York City suburbs. While the title of the film refers to the red door of the Wong's house in New York, red doors are said to bring good luck. Throughout the film, the red door is a sign for luck for the many struggles the Wongs must face.

After retiring, Ed Wong (Tzi Ma) plans to escape from his life in the suburbs, yet his daughters have other plans.
 
Samantha (Jacqueline Kim) is the eldest daughter of the Wongs. She is a businesswoman  in New York and engaged to Mark (Jayce Bartok). When facing her thirtieth birthday, Samantha runs into Alex (Rossif Sutherland) which forces her to reevaluate her career and love life.

Julie (Elaine Kao) is the shy middle sister of the Wongs. She is a fourth-year medical student who enjoys ballroom classes. Always quiet and center of the family, Julies begins to question her life choices as she meets Mia Scarlett (Mia Riverton).

Katie (Kathy Shao-Lin Lee) is the youngest Wong sister. In her senior year of high school Katie is involved in a prank war with Simon (Sebastian Stan). As the movie continues the pranks escalate between the neighbors and longtime nemesis.

Before disappearing, Ed decides to relive his family's history through VHS footage. Between the happier past and cold reality, Ed feels it is best to leave home. While the Wongs each face their own struggles, the family learns to communicate again through the stories and images of the past.

Cast
 Jacqueline Kim as Samantha Wong. The oldest daughter engaged to Mark. 
 Elaine Kao as Julie Wong, the middle daughter and medical student. 
 Kathy Shao-Lin Lee as Katie Wong, the youngest daughter and senior in high school.
 Tzi Ma as Ed Wong, the suicidal father.
 Sebastian Stan as Simon, involved in a prank war with Katie. 
 Freda Foh Shen as May-Li Wong, the mother.
 Jayce Bartok as Mark, Samantha's fiancé.
 Rossif Sutherland as Alex, a musician and ex-boyfriend of Samantha.
 Mia Riverton as Mia Scarlett, a TV and film actress dating Julie.

Production
Lee, a Philadelphia, Pennsylvania native and oldest of three sisters, wrote and produced her first full-length film in 2005. Although Red Doors was Lee's first full-length feature film, her first short film was called The Big Dish which was produced while taking film classes at NYU. Lee states that the film Red Doors benefits from different aspects shown in all of the short films she has produced. 
The film was produced independently by Georgia Lee because Hollywood producers wanted to make the Wongs a Caucasian family for commercial purposes. In order to produce the film independent of ordinary Hollywood productions, Lee formed Blanc de Chine, a production company that she would further run herself and with the help of college friends. When asked why the film is important to her, Lee states that the story started as her own, yet while creating the script she was more interested in the backstory and how to capture a unique period of time in a family's dynamic. Lee further states that she was interested in correcting some of the typical stereotypes of Asian Americans usually portrayed in film. Also, in order to incorporate a mix of fact vs. fiction, the home videos that can be seen in the film are actual home videos shot by Lee's father as she was growing up. The videos were inserted due to the minimal budget the film had to work with, and the lack of funds needed to re-film such scenes.

Reviews
 In 2006, Thelma Adams of Us Weekly stated that "Lee paints a rich and insightful family portrait that is both funny and tender." She goes on to state that although the film painted a truthful image, the performances made by the men of the film were no match compared to the performances played by the film's actresses of the "winning sister story."
In 2005, Sheri Linden of The Hollywood Reporter stated that "Lee's comedy-drama is big on heart but never sappy, without overdoing the quirk factor or the melodrama, Lee shows a sure feel for family dynamics."
 Elizabeth Weitzman, of New York Daily News, states that "There's enough affection and insight to make Lee's next movie worth watching for."
Ty Burr, of The Boston Globe, states "Think of Red Doors as a promise, and hope that Georgia Lee keeps it."
Janet Hanson, of The Wall Street Journal, wrote "This is a hilariously funny and unbelievably revealing film about an Asian family living in the U.S. and dealing with the colliding worlds of their traditional heritage and their current reality. The choices they must make as individuals, as family members and as Asian Americans are sometimes humorous, sometimes heartbreaking -- and ultimately self-defining for the characters, the filmmakers and those of us who watch the film."
Las Vegas Weekly calls the film, "charming, honest and heartfelt" while The New York Times calls it, "Unique and yet a universal story."
 Logan Hill, of NewYorkMetro.com, states "Georgia Lee's understated family drama about a Chinese American family in the New York burbs, is an artfully observed, promising debut."

Awards
Best Narrative Feature Award in the NY, NY Competition at the Tribeca Film Festival, 2005
Special Jury Award for Ensemble Acting at CineVegas
Audience Award at Outfest
Grand Jury Award for Screenwriting at Outfest
Georgia Lee has been a juror for Sundance Film Festival and Tribeca Film Festival

References

External links
 . Wayback Machine. Archived from the original on 2004-12-05.
 
 Red Doors Youtube Channel

2005 films
2005 comedy-drama films
American comedy-drama films
American LGBT-related films
Films about Chinese Americans
Films about Taiwanese Americans
Lesbian-related films
LGBT-related films about Chinese Americans
2005 LGBT-related films
Asian-American drama films
2005 independent films
2000s English-language films
2000s American films